Lancaster is a city in Schuyler County, Missouri, United States. As of the 2020 census, its population was 675. It is the county seat of Schuyler County.

Lancaster is part of the Kirksville Micropolitan Statistical Area.

History

A post office called Lancaster has been in operation since 1846. According to one tradition, the community was named after Lancaster, Ohio, the former home of a first settler.

The William P. Hall House was added to the National Register of Historic Places in 1975.

Geography
Lancaster is located at  (40.524087, -92.529190).

Demographics

2010 census
At the 2010 census there were 728 people, 326 households, and 187 families living in the city. The racial makup of the city was 98.2% White, 0.5% Asian, 0.1% from other races, and 1.1% from two or more races. Hispanic or Latino of any race were 0.7%.

Of the 326 households 29.4% had children under the age of 18 living with them, 39.6% were married couples living together, 14.1% had a female householder with no husband present, 3.7% had a male householder with no wife present, and 42.6% were non-families. 38.0% of households were one person and 20.8% were one person aged 65 or older. The average household size was 2.23 and the average family size was 2.96.

The median age was 38.3 years. 26.2% of residents were under the age of 18; 8.2% were between the ages of 18 and 24; 22.6% were from 25 to 44; 22.9% were from 45 to 64; and 20.2% were 65 or older. The gender makeup of the city was 46.4% male and 53.6% female.

2000 census
At the 2000 census there were 737 people, 319 households, and 203 families living in the city. The population density was 494.7 people per square mile (191.0/km). There were 370 housing units at an average density of 248.4/sq mi (95.9/km).  The racial makup of the city was 99.46% White, 0.14% Native American, 0.14% Pacific Islander, 0.27% from other races. Hispanic or Latino of any race were 0.41%.

Of the 319 households 29.5% had children under the age of 18 living with them, 51.7% were married couples living together, 10.7% had a female householder with no husband present, and 36.1% were non-families. 33.5% of households were one person and 21.6% were one person aged 65 or older. The average household size was 2.31 and the average family size was 2.93.

The age distribution was 25.4% under the age of 18, 7.7% from 18 to 24, 23.7% from 25 to 44, 19.7% from 45 to 64, and 23.5% 65 or older. The median age was 40 years. For every 100 females, there were 80.2 males. For every 100 females age 18 and over, there were 77.4 males.

The median household income was $27,202 and the median family income  was $37,083. Males had a median income of $28,889 versus $19,063 for females. The per capita income for the city was $14,263. About 13.8% of families and 18.9% of the population were below the poverty line, including 29.3% of those under age 18 and 9.5% of those age 65 or over.

Education
Lancaster has a public library, the Schuyler County Library District.

Notable people
 William Preston Hall (aka "the Colonel," "Diamond Billy," "Horse King of the World") (February 29, 1864 – June 29, 1932) Circus impresario, dealer in exotic animals, horses, and mules.
 Howard R. Hughes Sr., co-founder of the Hughes Tool Company and father of Howard Robard Hughes Jr., the reclusive multi-millionaire.
 Rupert Hughes, well known novelist and Oscar-winning screenwriter. Brother of Howard Hughes Sr. and uncle of Howard Hughes, Jr.
 Isabel Grimes Richey (1858–1910), writer

References

External links
 Historic maps of Lancaster in the Sanborn Maps of Missouri Collection at the University of Missouri

Cities in Schuyler County, Missouri
County seats in Missouri
Kirksville micropolitan area, Missouri
Cities in Missouri